HMS Cadmus was a  of the Royal Navy. She was launched at Sheerness in 1903, spent her entire career in the Far East and was sold at Hong Kong in 1921.

Design
Cadmus was constructed of copper-sheathed steel to a design by William White, the Royal Navy Director of Naval Construction. Her propulsion was provided by a J. Samuel White three-cylinder vertical triple expansion steam engine developing  and driving twin screws. She and her sisters were an evolution of the Condor-class sloop, carrying more coal, which in turn gave a greater length and displacement. This class comprised the very last screw sloops built for the Royal Navy, and Espiegle was the last Royal Navy ship built with a figurehead.

Sail plan
As designed and built the class was fitted with a barquentine-rigged sail plan. After  was lost in a gale in 1901, the Admiralty abandoned sails entirely. Espiegle was never fitted with sails, and the rest of the class had their yards removed in 1914. The official attitude to sails and the loss of yards did not completely prevent the use of sails, and log entries show that fore-and-aft sails were being used in Odin as late as April 1920.

Armament
The class was armed with six 4-inch/25pdr (1ton) quick-firing breech loaders and four 3-pounder quick-firing breech loaders, as well as several machine guns.

Construction
Cadmus was laid down at Sheerness Dockyard on 11 March 1902, and launched on 29 April 1903. She was commissioned in 1904 for the Far East.

Service history

Cadmus started her career on the Australia Station, where she arrived on 13 July 1904; her maiden voyage to Australia was accomplished in record time for a sloop.  She was refitted at Cockatoo Island Dockyard, Sydney in 1905.

In May 1905, she was ordered to follow Clio to the China Station and served there for the rest of her career. She recommissioned at Hong Kong on 18 October 1912, and remained on the China Station during World War I. In November 1914 she arrived at Direction Island in the Indian Ocean a week after the battle between Emden and Sydney to bury the sailors killed in action. She was in Singapore during the Sepoy Mutiny of February 1915, and her crew was involved in capturing the mutineers. In 1920, she was listed as "unallocated" at Hong Kong.

Fate
She was sold at Hong Kong on 1 September 1921.

References 

Bastock, John (1988), Ships on the Australia Station, Child & Associates Publishing Pty Ltd; Frenchs Forest, Australia. 

  Transcription of ship's logbooks October 1913 to July 1920

1903 ships
Cadmus-class sloops
Victorian-era sloops of the United Kingdom
World War I sloops of the United Kingdom